Fadi Salback (born January 8, 1998) is a Canadian-Israeli footballer who plays as a forward for Hapoel Migdal HaEmek.

Career 
Salback was born in Haifa, Israel, and later immigrated to Ontario, Canada with his family. He played at the college level in 2019 with Ontario Tech Ridgebacks. In 2020, he was named the U-Sports Rookie of the Year and the Ontario Tech's Athlete of the Year.

After the conclusion of the college season, he played in the Canadian Soccer League with FC Vorkuta. He initially played in the Second Division with FC Vorkuta B and recorded nine goals in three appearances. He was later promoted to the first team in the First Division and assisted in securing the First Division title.

In July 2020, he was offered a trial with FC Podillya Khmelnytskyi in the  Ukrainian Second League. He ultimately signed a contract with FC Podillya Khmelnytskyi. He made his debut for Podillya on August 20, 2020, against FC Dinaz Vyshhorod. He recorded his first two goals on October 10, 2020, against FC Uzhhorod. In his debut season with Podillya, he assisted in securing promotion to the Ukrainian First League by finishing first in the Group A division.

On July 20, 2021, he signed a contract with FSC Bukovyna Chernivtsi. He recorded his first two goals for Bukovyna on August 14, 2021, against FC Rubikon Kyiv. In November 2021, his contract was terminated with Bukovyna. In January 2022, he signed a contract with Hapoel Bu'eine F.C. of Liga Alef. After a short term at Hapoel, he signed with league rivals Maccabi Tzur Shalom in February 2022. On July 28, 2022, he remained in the Israeli third tier by signing with Hapoel Migdal HaEmek.

Honors 
FC Vorkuta

 Canadian Soccer League First Division: 2019

Career statistics

Club

References

External links
 
 

1998 births
Living people
Canadian soccer players
Canadian expatriate soccer players
Expatriate footballers in Ukraine
Canadian expatriate sportspeople in Ukraine
FC Continentals players
FC Podillya Khmelnytskyi players
FC Bukovyna Chernivtsi players
Canadian Soccer League (1998–present) players
Ukrainian Second League players
Footballers from Haifa
Association football forwards
Hapoel Bu'eine F.C. players
Maccabi Tzur Shalom F.C. players
Hapoel Migdal HaEmek F.C. players